Vincenzo Sicignano (born 8 July 1974 in Pompei, Province of Naples) is an Italian former football goalkeeper turned coach. He is currently working as goalkeeping coach for Empoli.

Playing career
Unlike other footballers from Naples which start their career at S.S.C. Napoli, he started his career at the Sicilian club Palermo.

He left Palermo to join Parma in summer 2003. He made his debut for Parma replacing Sébastien Frey at half-time against Salzburg on 6 November 2003. He made his Serie A debut in the 0–0 draw against A.C. Milan three days later. He also started the return leg against Salzburg, which Parma won 5–0 at home.

After his only Serie A appearance, and two more in the 2003–04 UEFA Cup, Sicignano joined Lecce on loan on 16 January 2004, which became a permanent deal.

After Lecce were relegated from Serie A, Sicignano joined ChievoVerona in the summer of 2006. He played 2 out of 2 qualifying matches in the 2006–07 UEFA Champions League, and 1 out of 2 in the 2006–07 UEFA Cup, but later in the season he lost his place in the starting lineup to Lorenzo Squizzi. He played the 2007-08 season with Frosinone, being transferred from Chievo in a loan (exchange with Massimo Zappino) deal.

In summer 2008, he was signed outright, but he just played 20 games, being challenged by Pierluigi Frattali for first choice. He became more of a regular in 2009, when he was featured in 33 league games (out of 42). In 2010, he played only 22 games.

He left Frosinone in 2011, after the club suffered relegation from Serie B, to join Barletta in the Lega Pro Prima Divisione league.

Post-playing and coaching career
After retiring in 2012, Sicignano accepted to return at his former club Palermo as goalkeeping coach of the Under-19 Primavera youth team. He was successively promoted to first team goalkeeping coach in June 2015.

References

1974 births
Living people
People from Pompei
Italian footballers
Palermo F.C. players
Parma Calcio 1913 players
U.S. Lecce players
A.C. ChievoVerona players
Frosinone Calcio players
Association football goalkeepers
Serie A players
Serie B players
Serie C players
Footballers from Campania